B2B e-commerce, short for business-to-business electronic commerce, is the sale of goods or services between businesses via an online sales portal. In general, it is used to improve the efficiency and effectiveness of a company's sales efforts. Instead of receiving orders using human assets (sales reps) manually – by telephone or e-mail – orders are received digitally, reducing overhead costs.

Definition

The differences between business-to-consumer (B2C) and business-to-business (B2B) 

B2B and B2C e-commerce may look the same, but they are quite different. Business buyers and retail consumers have different purchasing needs. The differences can be:
 Buying Impulsively Vs. Buying Rationally - B2C buyers will buy on impulse and make one-off purchases, while B2B buyers plan for purchases and make recurring purchases.
 Single Decision Maker Vs. Multiple Decision Makers - B2C purchases are decided upon by the buyer, B2B purchases often involve several layers of approval and may involve different departments.
 Short-term Customer Relationship Vs. Long-term Customer Relationship - B2C purchases are often one-off purchases, and B2B purchases are based on long-term and ongoing relationships.
 Set, Fixed Prices Vs. Diverse Prices - B2C prices are generally not negotiable. B2B prices are usually negotiated individually.
 Pre-Delivery Payment Vs. Post-Delivery Payment - B2C e-Commerce is generally paid by credit card, debit card or PayPal before the goods are shipped B2B payment is often on terms and maybe 30 or more days after goods are shipped.
 Deliveries focused on speed Vs. Deliveries focused on punctuality - B2C buyers are looking for speed of delivery and B2B buyers want deliveries on a reliable schedule.

B2B buyer characteristics 
Supply chains are more important to B2B transactions. Manufacturing companies obtain components or raw materials from other companies and then sell to a wholesaler, distributor, or retail customer. For example, an automobile manufacturer makes several B2B transactions such as buying tires, glass for windscreens, and rubber hoses for its vehicles. The final transaction, a finished vehicle sold to the consumer, is a single B2C transaction.  Wholesalers and distributors still have a supply chain, but their chain consists of finished products. 

Generally, B2B and B2C web stores both have search, navigation, detailed product information and personal account history pages. However, in some ways, B2B greatly differs from B2C. Most B2B businesses have complex ordering processes, large collections of attributes and elaborate back-end systems. Moreover, in a B2B scenario, buying is part of the customers’ jobs. He needs to make sure he buys all the necessary products or components for keeping his company up and running. Thirdly, since organizations can be very large, they need a lot of products or components to keep their business going. Therefore, B2B buyers often place large orders. B2B purchases are also characterized by recurring orders instead of single purchases. Because of that, companies make deals based on their monthly or even yearly demand. They closely collaborate, and each B2B customer can have its specific prices for certain products. Lastly, multiple people are involved in B2B purchases. For instance, a company can have multiple buyers or buying centres. They are responsible for finding the right products and making the right deal with resellers. Because multiple people are involved in a single deal, B2B is more fact-based instead of based on emotions. It's not about the nicest packaging, but the best deal for the company. In general, the ratio is leading.

The characteristics mentioned above can be summarized as follows:

The differences between B2B e-commerce and EDI 

B2B transactions can be processed online in various ways, of which Electronic Data Interchange (EDI) and B2B e-commerce is most often used. Although EDI and B2B e-commerce both have their own, distinctive features, they are frequently confused.

EDI is the electronic transfer of purchasing information between the buyer and seller. EDI transmits the information from the buyer's purchase order to the seller's sales or customer service department for conversion to a sales order.  EDI is well suited for placing large, recurring orders to supply raw materials to manufacturers. For instance, following the example above, an automobile manufacturer regularly needs to order a specific brand and size of tires for a certain car model. When manufacturing a certain number of that type of car, the buyers can use EDI  to place an order for the number of tires needed. So, the seller need not worry about providing product information – like a description, images or pricing –for reordering purposes.

Although, like EDI, sales orders are processed online, with B2B e-commerce it is possible for customers to order occasionally and in irregular order quantities. Also, B2B e-commerce enables the display of many different types of detailed figures and images. It is possible to exhibit a full range of products or parts. Therefore, a web store provides the opportunity to cross- and upsell.

Market development and trends 
The B2B e-commerce market is changing fast. There is an increasing number of companies adding an online sales channel to their business. In 2014, 63% of industrial supplies buyers purchased their products online (UPC, 2014). It is expected that in the USA, the B2B e-commerce market will even grow from $780B in 2015 to $1.1T in 2020  it is an objective of European Union Enterprise policy to "enhance trust and confidence" in B2B electronic markets.

Integrated B2B e-commerce versus interfaced e-commerce 

With integrated e-commerce, part of the software solution is installed inside the ERP back-end system. This means that the connection between the business logic and the database of a back-end system is configured automatically. Information that is available in the back-end system, for example, article numbers, prices, and the current stock availability of products are leveraged, without being copied to another system, and displayed in the front/back end of the e-commerce system. An integrated e-commerce software solution thus does not require investments in recreating and maintaining a separate database or business logic. Instead, it re-uses those of the back-end system, so all data are stored in one, single place. This can prevent input redundancy, errors, and synchronization time.

In most cases, integrated e-commerce is in one way or another acknowledged by the supplier of the back-end system, such as SAP ERP or Microsoft Dynamics.
Although many B2B e-commerce suppliers claim to be integrated, most web stores are interfaced. With interfaced e-commerce, the software solution is installed on top of the back-end system. This means that the connection between the business logic and the database of a back-end system is set up manually. Information that is available in the back-end system is being duplicated into the e-commerce software. An interfaced e-commerce software product thus has its own database and business logic that are being synchronized constantly through a connection to a certain back-end system.

Mobile 

The phrase mobile commerce was originally coined in 1997 by Kevin Duffey at the launch of the Global Mobile Commerce Forum, to mean "the delivery of electronic commerce capabilities directly into the consumer's hand, anywhere, via wireless technology." Mobile e-commerce for B2B is becoming increasingly popular. B2B has features different from mobile e-commerce for B2C. Whereas B2C is mostly classic catalogue browsing, mobile e-commerce for B2B requires specific features, which include:

 Displayed prices that are customer specific;
 Stock indication that is always up-to-date;
 Discounts that are calculated in real-time;
 Orders can be placed quickly, for example with order histories or lists based on filtered product sets;
 Sales agents should be able to represent their customers.

See also 
 E-commerce  
 Types of e-commerce  
 Online marketplace

References

E-commerce
Business-to-business